Srowolan is a village in Pakem administrative district of Sleman Regency, Special Region of Yogyakarta.

Some of the main attractions of this village include Banyusumilir, an outbound business owned by a local resident, salak orchards, and Pasar Perjuangan market. The market, established in 1921 by the Sultan, has not been active for over thirty years, however continues to be the property of the Kraton.

References

Sleman Regency